Genda or GENDA can refer to:
 Minoru Genda (1904–1989), Japanese military aviator and politician
, Japanese professional baseball player
 Tesshō Genda (born 1948), Japanese voice actor
 Genda Lal Chaudhary (born 1951), Indian politician
 Genda Lal Dixit (1888–1920), an Indian revolutionary
 The Gender Expression Non-Discrimination Act, a 2019 New York law

See also 
 Sasural Genda Phool, an Indian television drama series which aired 2010-12
 Genda Phool, a song by Badshah